Scott James McLean (born 17 June 1976 in East Kilbride, South Lanarkshire) is a Scottish professional footballer.

A striker, McLean began his career with St Johnstone in 1995. He remained at McDiarmid Park for just a year, making six league appearances. In 1996, he joined Inverness Caledonian Thistle. In three years with the Highland club he made 48 appearances, scoring 32 goals. After a loan period at Queen of the South in 1999, he joined Partick Thistle. He went on to make 80 league appearances for the Jags and scored 38 goals in the process.

In 2002, he signed for St Mirren, but remained with the club for just six months before moving to Stirling Albion. He scored 30 goals for Albion in 49 appearances. His most recent club, for the 2005-06 season, was Stranraer.

McLean won the Scottish Third Division, Second Division and First Division trophies during his career and was named PFA Second Division Player of the Year in 2002 while with Partick Thistle. He later owned a building company.

Notes

References

Profile at PlayerHistory.com

1976 births
Living people
Sportspeople from East Kilbride
Scottish footballers
St Johnstone F.C. players
Inverness Caledonian Thistle F.C. players
Scottish Junior Football Association players
East Kilbride Thistle F.C. players
Queen of the South F.C. players
Partick Thistle F.C. players
St Mirren F.C. players
Stirling Albion F.C. players
Stranraer F.C. players
Scottish Football League players
Scottish Premier League players
Footballers from South Lanarkshire
Association football forwards